David "Mudcat" Saunders is a Democratic political strategist and author. Saunders was a senior advisor in the 2008 Presidential campaign of John Edwards. He is widely credited with playing important roles in the election of Mark Warner to the office of Governor of Virginia in 2001 and the election of Jim Webb to the U.S. Senate in 2006.

Saunders encourages candidates to show respect for rural culture in order to break through some of the social barriers currently keeping some rural white males from voting for Democrats in larger numbers. He often says that once you can break through the culture, people will listen to what you have to say about the issues.

He is co-author, with political strategist Steve Jarding, of a book on the topic, Foxes in the Henhouse: How the Republicans Stole the South and the Heartland, and What the Democrats Must Do to Run 'em Out.

In a 2005 interview with the blog SouthNow, Saunders was asked, "Why did the Democrats lose in 2004?":

Many feature articles have been written about Saunders, including two cover articles by Matt Labash in the Weekly Standard. In one, he expresses his opinion of "inside the beltway" wisdom:

In 2006, Saunders was a senior advisor in the 2006 U.S. Senate campaign of Jim Webb in Virginia. He is credited by Jim Webb himself for convincing Webb to run for Senate, as described in this article in Rolling Stone magazine:

In 2006, Saunders also served on the Advisory Board of the Commonwealth Coalition, a group organized to oppose the Marshall/Newman amendment (2006 amendment to the Virginia constitution banning gay marriage). In regards to Virginia's anti-gay marriage amendment, Saunders was quoted as saying the following:

References

External links
Mudcat's Blog
Edwards: Getting Ready to Run?
Strategist 'Mudcat' draws national attention
Video of interview with Saunders
When Bubba Meets Obama
US elections: 'Scots-Irish hillbilly' can make Barack Obama's White House dream come true

American political consultants
Living people
Place of birth missing (living people)
Virginia Democrats
Year of birth missing (living people)